Vector NTI was a commercial bioinformatics software package used by many life scientists in the early 2000s to work, among other things, with nucleic acids and proteins in silico. It allowed researchers to, for example, plan a DNA cloning experiment on the computer before actually performing it in the lab.

It was originally created by InforMax Inc, North Bethesda, MD in 1993 and versions in the early 2000s were well reviewed at the time. However, in 2008 it was locked and turned into a commercial software after 2008 which created problems for locked in users who were forced to buy the software to continue accessing their data on newer computers. What was previously a single software package was subsequently split into Vector NTI Express, Advanced, and Express Designer.

Vector NTI was discontinued by its corporate parent Thermo Fisher at the end of 2019 and support ceased a year later.

Features 

 create, annotate, analyse, and share DNA/protein sequences
 perform and save BLAST searches
 design primers for PCR, cloning, sequencing or hybridisation experiments
 plan cloning and run gels in silico
 align multiple protein or DNA sequences
 search NCBI's Entrez, view, and save DNAs, proteins, and citations
 edit chromatogram data, assemble into contigs

See also 

 Bioinformatics
 Cloning vector
 Computational biology
 Expression vector
 List of open source bioinformatics software
 Restriction map
 Vector (molecular biology)
 Vector DNA

References

External links 

Description of software
 Vector NTI homepage at Invitrogen.com
 Vector NTI at openwetware.org
 Vector NTI v10 (only PC)

Tutorials
 Vector NTI tutorial at NorthWestern.edu
 
 

Other
 description of Vector NTI Viewer

Bioinformatics software